Géza Tóth may refer to:

 Géza Tóth (gymnast) (1907–1990), Hungarian Olympic gymnast
 Géza Tóth (handballer) (1962–2004), Hungarian handball player
 Géza Tóth (weightlifter) (1932–2011), Hungarian weightlifter
 Géza M. Tóth (born 1970), Hungarian filmmaker

See also
Tóth (surname)